Diogo Jorge Rosado (born 21 February 1990) is a Portuguese professional footballer who plays for Lusitânia F.C. as a midfielder.

Formed at Sporting CP, he made 32 Primeira Liga appearances with Feirense, Vitória de Setúbal and Paços de Ferreira, as well as 20 in the second tier for Penafiel and Benfica B. He spent much of his career abroad, in brief spells in England, France, Cyprus, Angola and Romania.

Club career

Sporting CP
Rosado was born in Peniche, Leiria District. A product of Sporting CP's prolific youth system, he made his professional debut in the 2009–10 season, being loaned to Lisbon neighbours Real S.C. in Massamá as the third division side was coached by Filipe Ramos – a former Sporting player.

Still owned by the Lions, Rosado moved to C.D. Feirense for 2011–12, making his Primeira Liga debut on 14 August in a 0–0 home draw against C.D. Nacional (two minutes played). He eventually started in 12 of his league appearances and scored twice, as the campaign ended in relegation.

Blackburn Rovers
On 31 August 2012, Rosado signed for Blackburn Rovers of the Football League Championship, on a three-year deal. On 31 January of the following year, however, he was loaned to S.L. Benfica B until June, with the option to make the move permanent.

Vitória de Setúbal
On 23 August 2013, Rosado had his contract at Blackburn terminated by mutual consent. He returned to his country shortly after, and agreed to a two-year deal at Vitória F.C. in the top tier.

Later years
Subsequently, Rosado rarely settled with a club, representing in quick succession AC Arles-Avignon (France), F.C. Paços de Ferreira, Ermis Aradippou FC (Cypriot First Division), and Progresso da Lunda Sul and C.D. Primeiro de Agosto (both in the Angolan Girabola).

Rosado moved to CS Gaz Metan Mediaș of the Romanian Liga II in January 2018. On 7 February the following year, he signed a contract with FC Farul Constanța alongside compatriots João Diogo and Pedro Celestino. He was one of 13 acquisitions by CS Concordia Chiajna of the same league in the winter 2020 transfer window.

In 2021, Rosado returned to domestic football for the first time in six years, at Leça F.C. in the fourth division. He scored the only goal on 20 November as they won at home to top-flight Gil Vicente F.C. in the fourth round of the Taça de Portugal.

International career
All youth levels comprised, Rosado won 46 caps for Portugal and scored four goals. He made his debut for the under-21 side on 9 August 2011, starting and being replaced during the second half of the 1–1 friendly draw with Slovakia.

Club statistics

Honours
1º de Agosto
Girabola: 2017

References

External links

1990 births
Living people
People from Peniche, Portugal
Sportspeople from Leiria District
Portuguese footballers
Association football midfielders
Primeira Liga players
Liga Portugal 2 players
Segunda Divisão players
Campeonato de Portugal (league) players
Sporting CP footballers
Real S.C. players
F.C. Penafiel players
C.D. Feirense players
S.L. Benfica B players
Vitória F.C. players
F.C. Paços de Ferreira players
Leça F.C. players
Lusitânia F.C. players
English Football League players
Blackburn Rovers F.C. players
Ligue 2 players
AC Arlésien players
Cypriot First Division players
Ermis Aradippou FC players
Girabola players
C.D. Primeiro de Agosto players
Liga I players
Liga II players
CS Gaz Metan Mediaș players
FCV Farul Constanța players
CS Concordia Chiajna players
Portugal youth international footballers
Portugal under-21 international footballers
Portuguese expatriate footballers
Expatriate footballers in England
Expatriate footballers in France
Expatriate footballers in Cyprus
Expatriate footballers in Angola
Expatriate footballers in Romania
Portuguese expatriate sportspeople in England
Portuguese expatriate sportspeople in France
Portuguese expatriate sportspeople in Cyprus
Portuguese expatriate sportspeople in Angola
Portuguese expatriate sportspeople in Romania